Gene Raymond (15 April 1919 – 1983) was an Indian boxer. He competed in the men's lightweight event at the 1948 Summer Olympics.

References

External links
 

1919 births
1983 deaths
Indian male boxers
Olympic boxers of India
Boxers at the 1948 Summer Olympics
Sportspeople from Kandy
Indian people of Sri Lankan descent
Indian emigrants to Australia
Lightweight boxers